Stefan Frederik Andersson (born 13 September 1971) is a former motorcycle speedway rider from Sweden.

Career
Andersson rode in Speedway Grand Prix twice and was the 1995 Nordic Champion.

Speedway Grand Prix results

Career details

World Championships 

 Individual World Championship (Speedway Grand Prix)
 2001 - 32nd place (4 points in one event)
 2005 - 21st place (5 points in one event)
 Team World Championship (Speedway World Cup)
 2002 -  Peterborough - Bronze medal (5 points)

See also 
 Sweden national speedway team
 List of Speedway Grand Prix riders
 Speedway in Sweden

References 

Swedish speedway riders
1971 births
Living people
Eastbourne Eagles riders
King's Lynn Stars riders
Oxford Cheetahs riders
Peterborough Panthers riders